Ece Çeşmioğlu Ölmez (born 26 November 1990) is a Turkish actress. She is best known for hit family comedy series "İki Aile", period series "Öyle Bir Geçer Zaman Ki", "Muhteşem Yüzyıl:Kösem" and military series "Söz".

Biography
Ece Çeşmioğlu Ölmez was born on 26 November 1990 in Istanbul. Her family is from Istanbul, Turkey and from Yugoslavia. She graduated from the Theater Department of Mimar Sinan University State Conservatory. She started her acting career at the age of 12 in hit comedy family series "Çocuklar Duymasın". Ece then drew attention with her performances in various TV series. With her husband Taner Ölmez, she played the character of Zeynep in the series Yüz Yüze and as Atike Sultan in "Muhteşem Yüzyıl: Kösem". (English: Face to Face).

Filmography

References

External links
 

1990 births
Living people
Turkish film actresses
21st-century Turkish actresses
Turkish television actresses
Turkish child actresses
Actresses from Istanbul